Allobates undulatus is a species of frog in the family Aromobatidae. It is endemic to Venezuela where it is only know from its type locality, Cerro Yutajé, in the Amazonas state. The specific name undulatus refers to the characteristic wavy-edged dorsal marking of this species.

Description
Adult males measure  and adult females  in snout–vent length. The head is little wider than the body. The snout is sloping, rounded in profile and broadly rounded in dorsal and ventral views. The tympanum is rather inconspicuous and is concealed dorsally and posteriorly by a diffuse supratympanic bulge. The fingers have moderately expanded discs. The toes have weakly to moderately expanded discs some basal webbing between the toes (only distinct between toes II–III). The dorsum is orangish brown, with a usually prominent, wavy-edged, darker brown or grayish brown figure. The face mask is black, continuing and widening behind the eye to become a broad lateral stripe. The arms are pale orange. The upper sides of thighs and shanks are brown (or shanks are brown and thighs are orange), with darker brown crossbands; the posterior thigh surface is either brown with an orange suffusion or overall bright orange.

Habitat and conservation
It is a common species within its limited range. The threats to this species are unknown. Its range is within the Formaciones de Tepuyes Natural Monument.

References

undulatus
Frogs of South America
Amphibians of Venezuela
Endemic fauna of Venezuela
Amphibians described in 2001
Taxa named by Maureen Ann Donnelly
Taxa named by Charles W. Myers
Taxonomy articles created by Polbot
Amphibians of the Tepuis